Musical instruments used in Baroque music were partly used already before, partly are still in use today, but with no technology. The movement to perform music in a historically informed way, trying to recreate the sound of the period, led to the use of historic instruments of the period and to the reconstruction of instruments.

The following table lists instruments, classified as brass instruments, woodwinds, strings, and basso continuo. The continuous bass is played by a group of instruments, depending on the given situation. Many instruments have an Italian or French name which is used as a common name also in English. The use of instruments by composers is shown in examples mostly by Johann Sebastian Bach.

Table of instruments

Baroque instrumentation 

The typical orchestra of the Baroque period is based on string instruments (violin, viola) and continuo. A continuous bass is the rule in Baroque music; its absence is worth mentioning and has a reason, such as describing fragility.

The specific character of a movement is often defined by wind instruments, such as oboe, oboe da caccia, oboe d'amore, flauto traverso, recorder, trumpet, horn, trombone, and timpani.

For Bach, some instruments carry symbolic meaning such as a trumpet, the royal instrument of the Baroque, for secular and divine majesty: three trumpets for the Trinity. In arias, Bach often uses obbligato instruments, which correspond with the singer as an equal partner. In his early compositions he used instruments that had become old-fashioned, such as viola da gamba and violone.

Continuo 

The basso continuo, or short: continuo, the typical bass group of the period, consists of a group of instruments, depending upon the other instruments playing and the performance location. A group may consist of cello, double bass (an octave lower) and organ. A bassoon is typically playing when other wind instruments are called for. While an organ will be played in church, a harpsichord will be used in secular surroundings.

Trumpet 

The trumpet is the royal instrument of the Baroque, representing secular and divine majesty. Three trumpets symbolize the Trinity in an aria of Bach's BWV 172, addressing the "Heiligste Dreifaltigkeit" (Most holy Trinity), where the bass voice is accompanied only by three trumpets and timpani.

Recorder 

Recorders (flauti dolci) are sometimes used to express humility or poverty, such as in Bach's cantata .

Flauto piccolo 
Bach used a flauto piccolo (what flauto?), a high recorder in F ("descant recorder" or "sopranino recorder"), to express for example the sparkling of the morning star in Herr Christ, der einge Gottessohn, BWV 96.

References 

 
Baroque music